Micklam railway station served the fireclay mine and brickworks at Micklam, a short distance north of Lowca in the former county of Cumberland, England, which is now part of Cumbria.

A public passenger service called at the station between 2 June 1913 and May 1926, though unadvertised workmen's trains had started in April 1912 and continued until April 1929, after which all forms of passenger service ceased.

By 1922 the service had settled down to three trains each way between Lowca and Workington Central, calling at Micklam. There was an extra on Saturdays, but it passed through Micklam without stopping.. There never was a public Sunday service.

The station was on the Harrington and Lowca Light Railway which connected with the Cleator & Workington Junction Railway (CWJR) at Rosehill Junction south of Harrington Village. Public passenger trains ran to these last two only.

Freight services
The railway through Micklam was first and foremost a mineral railway, with the short-lived workmen's and passenger services an afterthought. Lines first reached the site at the end of the Nineteenth Century, eventually running northwards towards Workington and southeastwards to meet the Gilgarran Branch at Bain's Siding. The driving forces were coal at Lowca, fireclay and bricks (primarily aimed at lining furnaces at Workington's steelworks), coke and coking bi-products. Centrepiece for over fifty years was Harrington No. 10 Colliery which, confusingly, was not in Harrington, but in Lowca.

A seldom-photographed  railway emerged from the fireclay drift mine then ran parallel to the Lowca Light railway along the clifftop to Micklam brickworks.

Between them these industrial concerns sustained the railway through Micklam until final closure to all traffic in May 1973.

See also
 Gilgarran Branch
 Cleator and Workington Junction Railway

References

Sources

Further reading

Bibliography

External links
 The closed station on an inter-war OS map National Library of Scotland
 The station Rail Map Online
 Latterday steam at Lowca flickr
 Latterday steam at Lowca flickr
 Industrial relics at Lowca flickr
 The line railwaycodes
 The Harrington collieries Haig Pit Mining Museum

Disused railway stations in Cumbria
Railway stations in Great Britain opened in 1913
Railway stations in Great Britain closed in 1926
1913 establishments in England